T. P. Gajendran (1955 – 5 February 2023) was an Indian film director and actor who played minor roles. He directed more than 15 films and acted in more than 100 films. He was the son of Tuticorin MR.Perumal.  Actress T. P. Muthulakshmi, his sister-in-law, helped with his upbringing.

Career
T.P. Gajendran worked as an assistant director to K. Balachander and Visu. He made his debut as an actor in the film Chidambara Rahasiyam (1985). In 1988, he made his directorial debut with the film Veedu Manaivi Makkal.

In the early 2000s, Gajendran directed a series of medium-budget family comedy drama films featuring Prabhu in titular lead roles. These include Budget Padmanabhan (2000), Middle Class Madhavan (2001), and Banda Paramasivam (2003), while a fourth film Aasai Vachen Unmele was shelved after a few schedules. He also attempted to make a Hindu devotional film, owing to the trend in Tamil cinema during 2001, but Karppoora Naayagi featuring Roja and Bhanupriya was later shelved.

In 2015, he was chosen as the president of Cinema Technicians Association (CTA).

Death
Gajendran died on 5 February 2023, at age 68.

Filmography

As director 
Films

As actor 

Television
 2009–2012: Idhayam

References

External links
 

1955 births
2023 deaths
Tamil male actors
Film directors from Tamil Nadu
Tamil film directors
Indian male film actors
Tamil comedians
20th-century Indian film directors
21st-century Indian film directors
Male actors from Tamil Nadu
Indian male comedians
20th-century Indian male actors
21st-century Indian male actors